Platycrana is the type genus of the reconstituted subfamily Platycraninae: which are stick insects from the Asia-Pacific region.  They belong to the monotypic tribe Platycranini Brunner von Wattenwyl, 1893. There is a monotypic species: Platycrana viridana (Olivier, 1792): originally described as "Mantis viridana" Olivier AG, with the type locality in the Moluccas.

References

External links

Phasmatodea genera
Phasmatodea of Asia